Christophe Jaffrelot (born 12 February 1964) is a French political scientist and Indologist specialising in South Asia, particularly India and Pakistan. He is a professor of South Asian politics and history the Centre d'études et de recherches internationales (CERI) at Sciences Po (Paris), a professor of Indian Politics and Sociology at the King's India Institute (London), and a Research Director at the Centre national de la recherche scientifique (CNRS).

Education
Christophe Jaffrelot is a graduate of the institut d’études politiques (Sciences Po) in Paris, the université de Paris-I Panthéon-Sorbonne and of the Institut national des langues et civilisations orientales (INALCO). He has a doctorate of political science from Sciences Po in 1991 and has received a post-doctoral Habilitation degree.

Career and work
Jaffrelot works at the Centre for Studies in International Relations (CERI)-Sciences Po and has served as its Director from 2000 to 2008.
He is currently a senior research fellow at CNRS and a professor at Sciences Po. He is also a visiting professor at the India Institute, King's College London, and has taught at Columbia University, Yale University, Johns Hopkins University, the Université de Montréal, and as a Global Scholar at Princeton University. Since 2008, he has been a non-resident fellow at the Carnegie Endowment for International Peace.

Jaffrelot was awarded the CNRS Bronze Medal in 1993, has served as editor or editor-in-chief of several scholarly journals on politics and sociology, and is a Permanent Consultant at the Direction de la Prospective of the French Ministry of Foreign Affairs. He also chairs the Scientific council of the six research centers of the French Ministry of Foreign Affairs and CNRS in Asia since 2007. Jaffrelot is the president of the Political Science section of the French National Committee for Scientific Research (CoNRS) since 2012.

Jaffrelot's research is centred on South Asia, particularly India and Pakistan. His publications on India cover aspects of Indian nationalism and democracy, Hindu nationalism, caste mobilisation in politics and ethnic conflicts. Similarly, on Pakistan, his scholarship has focused on Pakistani nationalism, Islamic fundamentalism, Taliban and Kashmir militancy, politics, coups and its history as a rentier state in the context of global geopolitics. His interest in India was kindled when he was still in school, through a philosophy teacher well-versed in Indian philosophy. He visited India when he was 20 and found the Indian society interesting in many different ways.

He is the senior editor of the Sciences Po book series, Comparative Politics and International Relations published by C. Hurst & Co.  He has been the editor-in-chief of Critique Internationale and serves on the editorial boards of Nations and Nationalism and International Political Sociology.  He is also on the editorial board of The Online Encyclopaedia of Mass Violence.

He often writes columns for the Indian Express and The Caravan, and received the Ramnath Goenka Award for Excellence in Journalism.
He was awarded the Brienne Prize for geopolitics by the Defense Ministry of France for his book Le Syndrome Pakistanais.

Publications 

 On India
 Les Nationalistes hindous (in French), Presses de Sciences Po, Paris, 1993
 The Hindu Nationalist Movement and Indian politics, London: C. Hurst & Co. and Penguin India, 1996, ; also published as Hindu Nationalism in India by Columbia University Press, 1998.
 L'Inde contemporaine de 1950 à nos jours (in French), direction, Fayard, Paris, 1996, rééd. 1997, 2006
 La Démocratie en Inde. Religion, caste et politique (in French), Fayard, Paris, 1998
 Dr Ambedkar - Leader intouchable et père de la Constitution indienne (in French), Sciences Po 2000, 
 The BJP and the Compulsions of Politics in India, co-edited with Thomas Blom Hansen, Oxford University Press India, 2000, .
 Tribus et basses castes. Résistance et autonomie dans la société indienne (in French), co-direction avec Marine Carrin, École des hautes études en sciences sociales, Paris, 2003
 India's Silent Revolution. The Rise of the Lower Castes in North India, Columbia University Press, C. Hurst & Co. and New Delhi: Permanent Black, 2003.
 Ambedkar and Untouchability. Analysing and Fighting Caste, New Delhi: Permanent Black, C. Hurst & Co. and Columbia University Press, 2004
 Sangh Parivar: A Reader (edited), Oxford University Press, 2005, .
 Inde : la démocratie par la caste. Histoire d'une mutation socio-politique (1885–2005) (in French), Fayard, Paris, 2005, 
 Hindu Nationalism: A Reader (edited), Princeton University Press, 2007, .
 Patterns of Middle Class Consumption in India and China, co-edited with Peter van der Veer, SAGE Publications, 2008, .
 India since 1950: Society, Politics, Economy and Culture (edited), New Delhi: Yatra Books, 2011.
 Muslims in Indian Cities: Trajectories of Marginalisation, co-edited with Laurent Gayer, C. Hurst & Co., 2012, .
 Rise of the Plebeians? The Changing Face of the Indian Legislative Assemblies, co-edited with Sanjay Kumar, Routledge, 2009, .
 Religion, Caste, and Politics in India, C. Hurst & Co., 2011, .
 Saffron Modernity in India: Narendra Modi and his Experiment with Gujarat, C. Hurst & Co., 2015, .
 Majoritarian State: How Hindu Nationalism is Changing India, co-edited with Angana P. Chatterji and Thomas Blom Hansen, C. Hurst & Co., 2019, 
 Business and Politics in India, eds. Atul Kohli, Kanta Murali and Christophe Jaffrelot (Oxford University Press, 2019).
 India's First Dictatorship: The Emergency, 1975-1977, co-authored with Pratinav Anil (C. Hurst & Co., December 2020).
 Modi's India: Hindu Nationalism and the Rise of Ethnic Democracy, Christophe Jaffrelot (Princeton University Press, August 2021).

 On Pakistan
 Le Pakistan (in French), direction, Fayard, Paris, 2000
 Le Pakistan, carrefour de tensions régionales (in French), direction, Complexe, Bruxelles, 1999, rééd. 2002
 Pakistan. Nationalism without a Nation?, direction, New Delhi: Manohar, London: Centre de sciences humaines and New York: Zed Books, 2002, rééd. 2004, .
 A History of Pakistan and Its Origins, direction, London: Anthem Press, 2004, .
 Le Syndrome Pakistanais (in French), 2013, 
 The Pakistan Paradox: Instability and Resilience, C. Hurst & Co., 2015, .
 Pakistan at the Crossroads: Domestic Dynamics and External Pressures (edited), Columbia University Press, 2016.

 On South Asia
 Armed Militias of South Asia: Fundamentalists, Maoists and Separatists, co-edited with Laurent Gayer, C. Hurst & Co., 2009, .

 Other topics
 Démocraties d'ailleurs. Démocraties et démocratisations hors d'Occident, direction, Karthala, Paris, 2000
 Revisiting Nationalism. Theories and Processes, co-edited with Alain Dieckhoff, C. Hurst & Co., 2005
 Emerging States: The Wellspring of a New World Order (edited), C. Hurst & Co., 2009, .

Reception 
The book Hindu Nationalist Movement and Indian Politics, based on his doctorate research, is considered Jaffrelot's magnum opus. Walter Andersen, a scholar who has studied the Hindu nationalist Rashtriya Swayamsevak Sangh (RSS), said that "for the expert on South Asia, this book is an absolute must." Craig Baxter, another author, said that it was required for anyone with an interest in South Asia. Stacey Burlet states that the book combines "an abundance of information" with "lucid analysis." Richard White states that the book is "formidably well researched and explores all the main arguments and themes relating to the subject." White adds that Jaffrelot – based on the research and understanding of Indian society and politics – predicted that the Hindu nationalist ideology-based Bharatiya Janata Party will not be able to win general elections and form the central government, a prediction that proved to be incorrect to Jaffrelot's misfortune.

According to Bhagwan Josh, Jaffrelot's The Hindu Nationalist Movement and Indian Politics is based on extensive fieldwork and effort making it an "immensely rewarding read", but makes a number of "untenable assumptions" regarding the nature of Indian culture, "Hindu consciousness/identity", and the nature of early Hindu nationalism within the Indian National Congress. According to T. V. Sathyamurthy, Jaffrelot's scholarship on Hindu nationalism is an important contribution with empirical depth and field research in Madhya Pradesh and the interviews of RSS members. He states that Jaffrelot's insights include Hindutva as a form of nationalism that is based on a "cultural criteria rather than on racial theory" and a view of "politics based on ethnic nationalism". Along with this and numerous other remarkable insights, Jaffrelot advocates a rubric of "Stigmatising and Emulating Threatening Others" strategy, which Satyamurthy finds to be flawed, "not only childish" but also "psychologically reductionist and politically nonsensical" in the context of India.

According to Asad Abbasi of London School of Economics, Jaffrelot's book The Pakistan Paradox is a necessary text for every student interested in Pakistan. However, states Abbasi, the book is "littered with spelling mistakes, repetition, tense conflicts and other silly errors — on page 130, Mumtaz Bhutto is cousin of ZA Bhutto, but by page 134 Mumtaz becomes Benazir’s cousin". According to Tania Patel, Jaffrelot provides "compelling insights for understanding the nuances of the contestations and continuities in Pakistan’s state and society" and elaborates "the country’s chronic instability in three contradictions whose roots lie in tensions apparent since the 1940s".

References

External links 

 Christophe Jaffrelot sur le site du CERI, with his biography and bibliography 
 Démocratie et économie de marché : La surprenante modernité indienne, online conference, April 2006
 Interview accordée au Nouvel Observateur regarding the motivations of the 2008 Mumbai attacks
 Christophe Jaffrelot columns at the Indian Express
 Christophe Jaffrelot columns at The Caravan

French political scientists
Living people
Writers about Hindu nationalism
French scholars of Pakistan studies
French male non-fiction writers
1964 births
Research directors of the French National Centre for Scientific Research